Miguel Pastura (born 27 May 1973) is a former professional tennis player from Argentina.

Pastura was a doubles runner-up, with Marcelo Charpentier, at the Eisenach Challenger tournament in 1994. He never played a doubles match on the ATP Tour but reached a ranking of 336 in the world.

The Argentine played South African right-hander Marcos Ondruska in the first round of the 1997 French Open, losing in straight sets.

References

1973 births
Living people
Argentine male tennis players
20th-century Argentine people